"The Encounter" (original Spanish title: "El encuentro") is a 1969 short story by Argentinian writer Jorge Luis Borges and later included in the collection "Dr. Brodie's Report", first published in 1970.

Short stories by Jorge Luis Borges
1969 short stories
Argentine speculative fiction works
es:El congreso